Peter Adeberg (born 23 May 1968) is a German speed skater who also represented East Germany. He competed in the 1988, 1992, 1994, and 1998 Winter Olympics.

References

External links

1968 births
Living people
Speed skaters at the 1988 Winter Olympics
Speed skaters at the 1992 Winter Olympics
Speed skaters at the 1994 Winter Olympics
Speed skaters at the 1998 Winter Olympics
German male speed skaters
Olympic speed skaters of East Germany
Olympic speed skaters of Germany
World record setters in speed skating
People from Merseburg
Sportspeople from Saxony-Anhalt
20th-century German people